This is a list of the largest river basins without fragmentation by dams in their catchments, ordered by average annual discharge.

To qualify for inclusion, a river must not only have no dams on its “main” stem, but also no dams on any tributary. For this reason, major world rivers such as the Amazon, Lena, Irrawaddy, Amur, and Fraser are disqualified because of dams on tributary streams.

Many of the rivers in this list have uncertain discharges. With the exception of those in Russia, streamgauges have seldom (if ever) been placed on the majority of the largest unfragmented river systems, due to the remoteness and/or ruggedness of the terrain in which they are located. Apart from the Fly which is clearly the largest, all ranks listed here are not perfectly certain, and there also exist a number of rivers in Sundaland that might qualify with reliable discharge data, such as the Kapuas.

See also
 List of longest undammed rivers

References
 Nilsson, Christer; Reidy, Catherine A.; Dynesius, Mats and Revenga Carmen; “Fragmentation and Flow Regulation of the World's Large River Systems”; in Science; 15 April 2005: Vol. 308 no. 5720 pp. 405–408; DOI: 10.1126/science.1107887
 Nuttall, Mark (editor); Encyclopedia of the Arctic 

Lists of rivers
Rivers